Valencia Park is a park in San Jose, California, located in Santana Row.

The park is a popular urban plaza in the city and often the site of local events.

History

The park was developed in 2001 as part of the initial redevelopment of Santana Row.

Location
Valencia Park is an urban park plaza in Santana Row, in West San Jose, located on Olin Avenue.

It is within walking distance of Stevens Creek Boulevard, a major area thoroughfare, and Winchester Avenue, a regional artery.

See also
Santana Row
Stevens Creek Boulevard

References

External links

Parks in San Jose, California